Penny Chapman is an Australian television producer. Her work includes the award-winning Brides of Christ, RAN Remote Area Nurse and My Place.

Penny received the Maura Fay Award for Services to the Industry at the 2013 Screen Producers Australia Awards.

Partial filmography (as producer)
Secret Weapon (1990)
Come in Spinner (1990)
Children of the Dragon (1991)
Brides of Christ (1991)
The Leaving of Liverpool (1992)
Seven Deadly Sins (1992)
Joh's Jury (1992)
Blackfellas (1993)
Dallas Doll (1993)
Blue Murder (1995)   
Bordertown (1995)
The Track (2000)
The Road from Coorain (2001)
Temptation (2002)
The Cooks (2004)
RAN Remote Area Nurse (2005)
Rampant, How a City Stopped a Plague (2007)
Darwin's Lost Paradise (2009)
The Slap (2011)
Sex, An Unnatural History (2011)
Leaky Boat (2011)
The Straits (2012

References

External links

Australian television producers
Australian women television producers
Year of birth missing (living people)
Living people